The First Mother of all Battles Championship, commonly referred to as the 1991 Iraqi Elite Cup, was the first occurrence of the Iraqi Elite Cup. This edition of the competition was organised by Al-Talaba. The top six teams of the 1990–91 Iraqi National League were supposed to compete in the tournament, but Al-Naft withdrew from the competition and were replaced by seventh-placed Al-Najaf. All the matches were played at Al-Shaab Stadium. The competition started on 2 September and ended on 13 September where, in the final, Al-Zawraa defeated Al-Quwa Al-Jawiya 3–1 after extra time.

Background
Al-Talaba proposed the establishing of a new tournament that includes only the top six teams of the 1990–91 Iraqi National League: Al-Zawraa, Al-Talaba, Al-Shorta, Al-Karkh, Al-Quwa Al-Jawiya and Al-Naft. Salim Rasheed, the vice president of Al-Talaba, stated that the competition would be played at Al-Shaab Stadium and in two groups. The Iraq Football Association agreed on the proposition on 24 August 1991.

The higher organizing committee of the competition held a meeting with the participating teams' representatives and the FA's representatives at Al-Talaba's headquarters on 25 August 1991 to discuss the start and end dates of the tournament and other technical matters. The duration of the competition was decided to be from 2–13 September 1991 and 31 August would be the last day to receive squad lists. Before the start of the tournament, Al-Naft did not accept the invitation, so they were replaced by Al-Najaf, the seventh-placed team of the league.

Pre-opening
The organizing committee invited 41 former national players, organizing a charity match between them, but only 24 got to play. The players were split into two teams. The green team included Jalal Abdul-Rahman, Muthanna Hameed, Saadi Toma, Shakir Ali, Falah Hassan, Ali Kadhim, Hadi Al-Janabi, Hassan Saddawi, Sabah Hatim, Ayoub Odisho, Abdelilah Abdul-Wahid and Jaleel Salih, while the white team consisted of Kadhim Khalaf, Samir Shaker, Ibrahim, Wathiq Aswad, Abdul-Zahra Aswad, Hussein Saeed, Haris Mohammed, Thair Ahmed, Mahdi Jassim, Faisal Aziz, Abdul-Karim Farhan and Abdul-Muhsin Mohammed. It ended in a 4–1 win for to the green team.

Group stage
The matches were drawn on 29 August 1991.

Group 1

Group 2

Semifinals

Third place match

Final

References

External links
 Iraqi Football Website

Football competitions in Iraq
1991–92 in Iraqi football